Merrill Daniel Gilfillan (born 14 May 1945) is an American writer of poetry, short fiction, and essays.

Life and work
Gilfillan was born and raised in Mount Gilead, Ohio, where his outdoorsman father (Merrill C. Gilfillan) worked as a naturalist for the state's Department of Natural Resources and helped inspire an early fascination with the natural world and its creatures. Gilfillan graduated in 1967 from the University of Michigan. He attended the University of Iowa Writer's Workshop for two years, studying with Ted Berrigan, Anselm Hollo, and George Starbuck, among others. He lived and worked in New York City for eight years and then moved to Colorado, which served as a base for frequent expeditions to the Great Plains and other regions of America from which he reports in essays, poetry, and short stories.  He now lives in Asheville, North Carolina.

Books
Poetry
Truck, Angel Hair Books, New York, 1970
9:15, Doones Press, Bowling Green, OH, 1970
Skyliner, Blue Wind Press, Berkeley, 1974
To Creature, Blue Wind Press, Berkeley, 1975
Light Years: Selected Early Poems, Blue Wind Press, Berkeley, 1977
River through Rivertown, The Figures, Great Barrington, MA, 1982
Coppers and Blues, Plum Pit, Boulder, 1997
On Heart River, Dayo, Denver, 1995
Satin Street, Moyer Bell, Wakefield, RI, 1997
The Seasons, Adventures in Poetry, New York | Boston,  2002
Small Weathers, Qua Books, Jamestown, RI, 2004
Undanceable, Flood Editions, Chicago, 2005
Selected Poems 1965-2000, Adventures in Poetry, New York & Boston 2005 
The Bark of the Dog, Flood Editions, Chicago 2010 
Harpsichord Hills, Horse Less Press, Grand Rapids, MI, 2013
Red Mavis, Flood Editions, Chicago 2014 
Would-be Dogwood, Shirt Pocket Press Grand Rapids, MI, 2017
Old River, New River, Red Dragonfly Press, Northfield, MN, 2019 

Essays
Magpie Rising: Sketches from the Great Plains, Pruett | Vintage | Bison, 1988 | 1990 | 2003
Burnt House to Paw Paw: Appalachian Notes, Hard Press, West Stockbridge, MA, 1997
Chokecherry Places: Essays from the High Plains, Johnson Books, Boulder, 1998
Rivers & Birds, Johnson Books, Boulder, 2003
The Warbler Road, Flood Editions, Chicago, 2010 
Fiction
Sworn Before Cranes, Crown, New York, 1994
Grasshopper Falls, Hanging Loose, Brooklyn, 2000
Talk Across Water, Flood Editions, Chicago, 2019
Drawings
Distant Rivers, Prairie Rose Press, Muscatine, IA, 2013

Interviews
Chicago Review, Winter, 2013
L’Art du paysage, vol. 7, "Motifs du Paysage Nord-American," Vincent Dussol, Paris, 2014
The Believer, "An Interview with Merrill Gilfillan", Martin Riker, April 18, 2019

Awards
1967, Major Hopwood Award for poetry, University of Michigan
1989, PEN/Martha Albrand Award for First Nonfiction for Magpie Rising
1998, Western States Book Award for Creative Nonfiction for Chokecherry Places

References

1945 births
20th-century American poets
Living people
University of Michigan alumni
Iowa Writers' Workshop alumni
People from Mount Gilead, Ohio
21st-century American poets
American male poets
American male essayists
20th-century American essayists
21st-century American essayists
20th-century American male writers
21st-century American male writers